"Lights Off" is a 2021 song by We Are Domi.

Lights Off may also refer to:

 "Lights Off", a song by Jay Sean from his 2009 album All or Nothing  
 "Lights Off", a 2021 song by Alpharad's band Ace of Hearts

See also
 
 Lights On (disambiguation)
 Lights Out (disambiguation)